Diploscapter is a genus of nematodes in the family Rhabditidae.

Phylogenetic studies 
The genus Diploscapter groups with the genera Protorhabditis and Prodontorhabditis to form the 'Protorhabditis' group, the sister group of the Caenorhabditis species, all included in the 'Eurhabditis' group of Rhabditidae genera.

References 

 Potential role of Diploscapter sp. strain LKC25, a bacterivorous nematode from soil, as a vector of food-borne pathogenic bacteria to preharvest fruits and vegetables. DS Gibbs, GL Anderson, LR Beuchat, LK Carta… - Applied and environmental …, 2005
 Diploscapter coronata as a facultative parasite of man, with a general review of vertebrate parasitism by rhabditoid worms. AC Chandler - Parasitology, 1938
 Postembryonic development and reproduction in Diploscapter coronata (Nematoda: Rhabditidae). HC HECHLER - Proceedings of the helminthological Society of …, 1968

External links 
 

Rhabditidae
Rhabditida genera